Indian Telly Award for Fresh New Face - Male  is an award given by Indiantelevision.com as part of its annual Indian Telly Awards for TV serials.

List of winners

2000s
2001 Not Awarded
2002 Not Awarded
2003 Not Awarded
2004 Rajeev Khandelwal - Kahiin To Hoga as Sujal  
Apoorva Agnihotri - Jassi Jaissi Koi Nahin
Akashdeep Saigal - Kyunki Saas Bhi Kabhi Bahu Thi as Ansh
Chetan Hansraj - Kkusum as Garv
Eijaz Khan - Kahiin To Hoga as Varun
2005 Iqbal Khan - Kaisa Ye Pyar Hai as Angad 
Gurpreet Singh - Kahin To Hoga as Tushar
Pawan Shankar - Siddhanth as Siddhanth
Bakhtiyaar Irani - Batliwala House No.43 as Shahrukh  
Ajay Gehi - Miilee as Rahul
2006 Pulkit Samrat - Kyunki Saas Bhi Kabhi Bahu Thi as Lakshya 
Naman Shaw - Kasamh Se as Pushkar
Indraneil Sengupta - Pyaar Ke Do Naam: Ek Raadha, Ek Shyaam as Shyam
Vikas Manaktala - Left Right Left as Hooda
Arjun Bijlani - Left Right Left as Alekh
2007 Jay Bhanushali - Kayamath as Neev 
Sharad Malhotra - Banoo Main Teri Dulhann  as Sagar Singh
Ajay Singh Chaudhary - Love Story as Dev
Romit Raj - Ghar Ki Lakshmi Betiyaan as Yuvraj Garodia
2008 Angad Hasija - Sapna Babul Ka...Bidaai as Alekh 
 Kinshuk Mahajan - Sapna Babul Ka...Bidaai as Ranveer
 Karan Hukku - Kasamh Se as Daksh
Saurabh Pandey - Jiya Jale as Chandan
Sushant Singh Rajput - Kis Desh Mein Hai Meraa Dil Preet Juneja
Vikrant Massey - Dharamveer as Dharam
2009 Avinash Sachdev - Chotti Bahu as Dev 
 Pankaj Singh Tiwari - Shree as Hari
Karan Kundra - Kitani Mohabbat Hai as Arjun Punj
Karan Mehra - Yeh Rishta Kya Kehlata Hai as Naitik
 Kunal Verma - Tujh Sang Preet Lagai Sajna as Yug

2010s
2010 Kavi Shastri - Rishta.Com as Rohan Mehra 
Shashank Vyas - Balika Vadhu as Jagdish
Rahul Bagga - Powder as Mahindra Ranade
Abhishek Tiwari - Chand Chupa Badal Mein as Siddharth Sood
Mohit Malhotra - Mitwa Phool Kamal Ke as Birju
2011 Not Awarded
2012 Kushal Tandon - Ek Hazaaron Mein Meri Behna Hai as Virat Singh Vadhera 
Gaurav S Bajaj - Sapnon Se Bhare Naina as Daksh Patwardhan
Ashish Kapoor - Dekha Ek Khwab as Yuvraj Rajkumar Udayveer Singh
Sumit Vats - Hitler Didi as Rishi
Sujay Reu - Ram Milaye Jodi as Anukalp Gandhi
2013 Nakuul Mehta - Pyaar Ka Dard Hai Meetha Meetha Pyaara Pyaara as Aditya Harish Kumar (Adi) 
Kunwar Amar - Dil Dosti Dance as Reyansh Singhania (Rey
Mudit Nayar - Anamika as Jeet Pratap Saluja (Anamika)
Shaleen Malhotra - Har Yug Mein Ayega Ek -Arjun as Arjun Suryakant Raute
Nishad Vaidya - Amita Ka Amit as Amit Shah
2014 Harshad Arora - Beintehaa as Zain Osman Abdullah
Mishkat Varma - Aur Pyaar Ho Gaya as Raj Purohit
Shivin Narang - Ek Veer Ki Ardaas...Veera as Ranvijay Sampooran Singh
Vishal Vashishta - Ek Veer Ki Ardaas...Veera as Baldev Balwant Singh
Himanshu Soni - Buddha as Buddha

2015 Priyanshu Jora - Tu Mera Hero as Ashish ''Titu'' Agarwal
2019 Adnan Khan - Ishq Subhan Allah as Kabeer Ahmed

References

Indian Telly Awards